No pain, no gain is an exercise motto.

No Pain, No Gain may also refer to:

Film and television
 No Pain, No Gain (2001 film), a Spanish film
 No Pain, No Gain (2005 film), a comedy-drama film 
 "No Pain, No Gain", part of the 1993 debut episode of Rocko's Modern Life 
 "No Pain No Gain", a 2005 episode from series 7 of Holby City
 "No Pain No Gain", a 2008 episode from season 10 of MythBusters

Music
 No Pain No Gain (album), a 1998 album by Ghetto Twiinz
 "No Pain, No Gain", a song from 1986 album The Final Frontier by Keel
 "No Pain No Gain", a 1987 single by The Whispers
 "No Pain No Gain," a 1988 hit single by Betty Wright
 "No Pain No Gain", a song from the 1988 album Prison Bound by Social Distortion
 "No Pain No Gain", a song from the 1993 album Face the Heat by the Scorpions
 "No Pain No Gain", a song from the 1994 album Funk Upon a Rhyme by Kokane
 "No Pain No Gain", a song from the 1998 album Til My Casket Drops by C-Bo
 "No Pain No Gain", a song from the 1998 album Everything Louder by Raven
 "No Pain, No Gain", a song from the 2006 album Gem by Beni Arashiro

See also
Pain & Gain